Single-stroke may refer to:

 Single-stroke pneumatic rifle, an air gun for which one motion of the cocking lever is all that is needed to compress the air for propulsion
 Single-stroke roll, alternating sticking of indeterminate speed and length in rudimental drumming